Lindsay Rewcastle (born 5 February 1955) is a New Zealand former cricketer. He played six first-class matches for Auckland in 1979/80.

See also
 List of Auckland representative cricketers

References

External links
 

1955 births
Living people
New Zealand cricketers
Auckland cricketers
Cricketers from Invercargill